Abraham de Swardt (born 3 April 1963) is a South African cricketer. He played in eight first-class matches for Boland in 1988/89 and 1989/90.

See also
 List of Boland representative cricketers

References

External links
 

1963 births
Living people
South African cricketers
Boland cricketers
Cricketers from Bellville, South Africa